Mendez vs. Westminster: For All the Children/Para Todos los Niños is a 2003 American documentary film written, directed, and produced by Sandra Robbie. The film features Sylvia Mendez, Robert L. Carter, and others.

Synopsis
In the mid-1940s, a tenant farmer named Gonzalo Mendez moved his family to the predominantly white Westminster district in Orange County and his children were denied admission to the public school on Seventeenth Street. The Mendez family move was prompted by the opportunity to lease a  farm in Westminster from the Munemitsus, a Japanese family who had been relocated to a Japanese internment camp during World War II. The income the Mendez family earned from the farm enabled them to hire attorney David Marcus and pursue litigation.

In 1945, the plaintiffs of Mendez, Palomino, Estrada, Guzman and Ramirez filed a class action lawsuit on behalf of 5,000 Mexican American children to integrate the schools in four Orange County school districts: Westminster, El Modena, Santa Ana, and Garden Grove.

Interviews
 Sylvia Mendez
 Sandra Mendez Duran
 Robert L. Carter
 Aki Munemitsu Nagauchi
 Gilbert Gonzalez, Professor, University of California, Irvine
 Christopher Arriola, President, California La Raza Lawyers Association
 Ruth Barrios
 Genevieve Barrios Southgate, daughter of Cruz Barrios
 Ralph Perez, El Modena parent
 Lloyd Jones, Assistant Superintendent, Garden Grove Unified School District (retired)
 Jerome Mendez
 Janice Munemitsu
 Frederick P. Aguirre, Superior Court, Orange County, California
 Felicitas Mendez

Background
Mendez vs. Westminster: For All the Children/Para Todos los Niños discusses the little-known Orange County case that made California the first state in the nation to end school segregation – seven years before Brown v. Board of Education.  NAACP attorney Thurgood Marshall and then-California Governor Earl Warren played key roles in both cases.

Unlike Plessy v. Ferguson (1896), which focused on racial discrimination and upheld the constitutionality of segregation based on race in public accommodations under the doctrine of "separate but equal," the plaintiffs in Mendez v. Westminster argued that the students were segregated into separate schools based solely on their national origin.

The U.S. Postal Service commemorated the Mendez case on a postage stamp in September 2007.

Accolades
Wins
 National Academy of Television Arts and Sciences: Emmy Award, 2003.

References

Bibliography
 
 
 

 
 
 
 Ettinger, David S. The History of School Desegregation in the Ninth Circuit, 12 Loyola of Los Angeles Law Review 481, 484-487 (1979).

Notes

External links
  (via California State Assembly)
 

2003 films
2003 documentary films
American documentary films
Documentary films about racism in the United States
History of racial segregation in the United States
American independent films
Westminster, California
2003 independent films
2000s English-language films
2000s American films